The Netherlands Football League Championship 1907–1908 was contested by seventeen teams participating in two divisions. The national champion would be determined by a play-off featuring the winners of the eastern and western football division of the Netherlands. HC & CV Quick won this year's championship by beating Koninklijke UD 4–1 in a decision match.

Divisions

Eerste Klasse East

Eerste Klasse West

Championship play-off

Replay

HC & CV Quick won the championship.

References
RSSSF Netherlands Football League Championships 1898-1954
RSSSF Eerste Klasse Oost
RSSSF Eerste Klasse West

Netherlands Football League Championship seasons
1907 in Dutch sport
1908 in Dutch sport